Zindagani is a 1986 Indian Hindi-language action drama film directed by Prabhat Roy, starring Raakhee, Mithun Chakraborty, Rati Agnihotri in lead roles, along with Ranjeet, Amjad Khan, Suresh Oberoi in supporting roles.

Cast
Raakhee as Sumitra
Mithun Chakraborty as Anand
Rati Agnihotri as Anuradha "Anu"
Ranjeet as Natwar Dada
Amjad Khan as Bhola
Suresh Oberoi as Sudarshan
Seema Deo as Mrs. Sudarshan
Iftekhar as Thakur
Paintal as Mantu
Madhu Malini as Dancer

Soundtrack

References

External links
 

1986 films
1980s Hindi-language films
Indian action drama films
Films scored by R. D. Burman
1986 action films
Hindi-language action films